Rukometni klub Danilovgrad is a handball club from Danilovgrad. The club has a rich history and tradition and is a member of Montenegrin Men's Handball First League.

History

For the most of the past, Danilovgrad played in the Montenegrin Republic League, with few seasons in the Second League. After the Montenegrin independence, club became a member of Second League, and gained the historical promotion to the Montenegrin First League in the summer 2009.

First League seasons

RK Danilovgrad played in the Montenegrin First League during the seasons 2009/10, 2013/14.

External links
Handball Federation of Montenegro

Danilovgrad
Danilovgrad Municipality